John J. Donovan Jr. (February 14, 1913 – March 12, 1955) was an American lawyer and politician from New York.

Life
He was born on February 14, 1913, in the Bronx, New York City, the son of Dr. John J. Donovan and Harriet (O'Connor) Donovan.  He attended St. Jerome's Academy. Fordham University

He was a member of the New York State Senate from 1951 to 1955, sitting in the 168th, 169th and 170th New York State Legislatures.

He died on March 12, 1955, in St. Elizabeth's Hospital in Manhattan, of a heart attack.

James B. Donovan (1916–1970), a lawyer and Cold War era negotiator, was his brother.

Sources

1913 births
1955 deaths
Politicians from the Bronx
Democratic Party New York (state) state senators
20th-century American politicians